is a town located in Fukushima Prefecture, Japan. , the town had an estimated population of 20,092 in 7306 households  and a population density of 73 persons per km2.

Geography
Aizumisato is located in the eastern portion of the Aizu region, in west-central Fukushima Prefecture on the southwestern edge of the Aizu Basin.

Mountains:  Mount Hakase, Mount Myojindake (1074 m)
Rivers: Aka River
Lakes: Miyagawa Dam

Neighboring municipalities
Fukushima Prefecture
Aizuwakamatsu
Aizubange
Yanaizu
Shōwa
Shimogō

Climate
Aizumisato has a Humid continental climate (Köppen Dfb) characterized by warm summers and cold winters with heavy snowfall.  The average annual temperature in Aizumisato is 13.1 °C. The average annual rainfall is 1320 mm with September as the wettest month. The temperatures are highest on average in August, at around 24.8 °C, and lowest in January, at around −1.4 °C.

Demographics
Per Japanese census data, the population of Aizumisato has declined steadily over the past 40 years.

History
The area of present-day Aizumisato was part of ancient Mutsu Province and formed part of the holdings of Aizu Domain during the Edo period. After the Meiji Restoration, it was organized as part of Ōnuma District in Fukushima Prefecture. The town of Aizumisato was created on October 1, 2005 with the merger of the two towns of Aizutakada and Aizuhongō and the village of Niitsuru, all from Ōnuma District.

Economy
The economy of Aizumisato is dominated by agriculture.

Education
Aizumisato has five public elementary schools and three public junior high schools operated by the town government. The town has one public high school operated by the Fukushima Prefectural Board of Education.
 Fukushima Prefectural Aizumisato High School

Transportation

Railway
 JR East – Tadami Line
  –

Highway
  – Niitsuru PA

Local attractions
Mukaihaguroyama Castle ruins, a National Historic Site 
Sakurdari Kannon

Sister-city relationships
Aizumisato has a sister-city relationship with the town of Naraha, also in Fukushima Prefecture. This is a renewal of the relationship Niitsuru had with Naraha prior to the merger.

References

External links

Official Website

Towns in Fukushima Prefecture
Aizumisato, Fukushima